Germiston Stadium (formerly the Herman Immelman Stadium) is a multi-purpose stadium in Germiston, South Africa.  It is currently used mostly for rugby matches and is the home stadium of Germiston Simmer Rugby Club . It is also used for inter-school athletics events and as a training venue for teams such as Bafana Bafana (the South African National Football Team) and the Lions.  The stadium holds 18,000 people.

Buildings and structures in Germiston
Sport in Germiston
Sports venues in Gauteng
Soccer venues in South Africa
Multi-purpose stadiums in South Africa
Athletics (track and field) venues in South Africa